This list of Confederate monuments and memorials in Virginia includes public displays and symbols of the Confederate States of America (CSA), Confederate leaders, or Confederate soldiers of the American Civil War. Part of the commemoration of the American Civil War, these symbols include monuments and statues, flags, holidays and other observances, and the names of schools, roads, parks, bridges, counties, cities, lakes, dams, military bases, and other public works.

This list does not include items of a more strictly documentary nature, such as historic markers or battlefield parks if they were not established to honor the Confederacy. Nor does it include figures connected with the origins of the Civil War or white supremacy, as distinct from the Confederacy.

, there are at least 239 public spaces with Confederate monuments in Virginia, more than in any other state.

Bridge
 Abingdon: The John Hunt Morgan Bridge, on East Main St./U.S. 11, is named for a Confederate general.
 Richmond: The Robert E. Lee Bridge, on U.S. 301

Buildings
 Alexandria: Robert E. Lee District RECenter -now Lee District RECenter.
 Lynchburg: Terrell Health and Counseling Center (formerly Alexander W. Terrell Memorial Infirmary) at Randolph College; named for Confederate General Alexander W. Terrell
 Manassas: Stonewall Jackson Volunteer Fire & Rescue Department
 Richmond: Hunter Holmes McGuire Veterans Administration Medical Center. McGuire was a Confederate veteran, Stonewall Jackson's and Jubal Early's personal physician, and an influential supporter of the "Lost Cause" view of the Confederacy and the Civil War.

Geological features
 Rockbridge: The Maury River is named after Matthew Fontaine Maury, who was a Commodore in the Confederate navy.

Highways
 Lee Highway, various locales retain the name for portions of this former auto trail route.  
 General Mahone Highway, a large portion of U.S. Route 460, between Petersburg and Suffolk.
 Jefferson Davis Highway, also called Jefferson Davis Memorial Highway. Some portions of the highway have been renamed, but other sections in Virginia still carry the name.
 Jubal Early Highway, a section of Virginia Rt. 116 in Franklin County, Virginia, from Roanoke City to Virginia Route 122 in Franklin County, is named after him. It passes his birthplace, identified by a historical highway marker. In Roanoke County, it is referred to as "JAE Valley Road," incorporating Jubal Anderson Early's initials.
 John Mosby Highway, the designation for most of U.S. Route 50 in Virginia, with portions also called Lee Highway, in Fairfax and Arlington, or Lee–Jackson Memorial Highway in Chantilly.
 Stonewall Jackson Highway is a named portion of U.S. Route 340.
Magruder Boulevard was a named portion of Virginia route 134, and had its name changed to Neil Armstrong Parkway in July 2021.

Monuments

Courthouse monuments
 Abingdon: Confederate Monument (1907), Frederick William Sievers, sculptor
 Amelia: Confederate Monument (1905)
 Amherst: Amherst County Confederate Monument (1922)
 Appomatox: Confederate Monument (1905)
 Bedford: Confederate Memorial (1935)
 Berryville: Confederate Memorial (1900)
 Bland: Confederate Monument (1911)
 Boydton: Monument to Confederate Soldiers of Mecklenburg (1908; rededicated in 2002)
 Buckingham: Monument and cannon dedicated to the Confederate soldiers of Buckingham County. (1908)
 Charlotte: Charlotte County Confederate Memorial (1901)
 Charlottesville, Albemarle County Monument, American Bronze Foundry Company (1909)
 Chatham: Confederate Dead Monument (1899; rededicated in 1967)
 Chesterfield: Confederate Memorial (1903)
 Courtland: Confederate Monument (1905)
 Dinwiddie: Confederate Monument (1909)
 Eastville: Confederate Monument (1913). "Erected by Harmanson-West camp Confederate veterans, the daughters of the Confederacy, and the citizens of the Eastern Shore of Virginia to the soldiers of the Confederacy from Northampton and Accomack Counties. They died bravely in war, or, in peace live nobly to rehabilitate their country. A. D. 1913."
 Emporia: Confederate Memorial (1910)
 Fincastle: Confederate Memorial (1904)
 Floyd: Confederate Monument (1904)
 Front Royal: Confederate Monument (1911)
 Gate City: Confederate Memorial (1988)
 Gloucester: Confederate Monument (1899)
 Halifax: Confederate Memorial (1911)
 Heathsville: Civil War Memorial, Northumberland County (1873)
 Hillsville: Confederate Monument (1907)
 King William: To Our Soldiers of the Confederacy Monument (1901)
 Lancaster: Lancaster County Confederate Monument (1872)
 Lawrenceville: Brunswick County Confederate Monument (1910)
 Leesburg: Confederate Soldier Memorial (1908)
 Louisa: Confederate Monument (1905)
 Lovingston: Confederate Monument (1965)
 Lunenburgh: Confederate Monument (1916)
 Marion: Confederate Monument (1904)
 Mathews: Our Confederate Soldier Monument (1912)
 Monterey: Confederate Monument (1918)
 Montross: Westmoreland County Confederate Monument (1876)
 New Castle: Confederate Monument (1912)
 Nottoway: Confederate Monument (1893)
 Palmyra: Confederate Memorial (1901)
 Pearisburg: Confederate Medal of Honor Monument (1995). Inscribed is the Jefferson Davis quote, "It is a duty we owe to posterity to see that our children shall know the virtues and rise worthy of their sires."
 Powhatan: Powhatan Troop Confederate Memorial (1999)
 Rocky Mount: Confederate Monument (1910)
 Spotsylvania Courthouse: Confederate Monument (1918)
 Smithfield: Confederate Monument (1905)
 Surry: Confederate Monument (1903)
 Sussex: Confederate Monument (1912)
 Tappahannock: Essex County Confederate Monument (1909)
 Tazewell: Confederate Memorial (1903)
 Warm Springs: Confederate Memorial (1922)
 Warrenton: Monument to CSA colonel John S. Mosby (1916)
 Washington: Confederate Monument (1898)
 Williamsburg: Williamsburg Confederate Monument (1908)
 Winchester: Confederate Soldiers Monument (1916) – in front of former courthouse, now museum. Plaque reads: "In honor of the Confederate soldiers from Winchester and Frederick County who faithfully served the South."
 Windsor: Confederate Monument (1905)

Other public monuments
 Alexandria:
 Plaques (1870) of Robert E. Lee and George Washington hang on either side of the altar at Christ Church, where both were parishioners.  Following a unanimous vote of its board in 2017, the church announced the plaques would be removed in 2018 once a new location of "respectful prominence" is identified.

 Berryville: Memorial (1986) and "hitching post" where Robert E. Lee tethered his horse, Traveller, while Lee "paused on his march to Gettysburg" to attended a church service
 Brandy Station: UDC monument (1998) dedicated to John Pelham
 Bristol: Confederate Soldier Monument (1910)
 Buchanan: Botetourt Artillery Obelisk (1902)
 Buckingham: Confederate Soldiers of Buckingham County (1908)

 Chancellorsville: Confederate monuments at the site of the Battle of Chancellorsville include:
 Jackson Memorial Boulder and Tablet (1888), placed by former members of Stonewall Jackson's staff
 General Thomas J. Jackson Shaft (1888), "On this spot fell mortally wounded Thomas J. Jackson Lt. Gen. C.S.A. May 2nd 1863"
 Lee-Jackson Bivouac Shaft (1903), "Bivouac, Lee and Jackson, night of May 1, 1863"
 Lee-Jackson Bivouac Tablet (1937)
 Brigadier General Elisha F. Paxton Tablet (1980), "In this vicinity Brig. Gen. E. F. Paxton, C.S.A. Aged 35 years, of Rockbridge County, VA. was killed on the morning of May 3, 1863 while leading his command, the Stonewall Brigade in the attack on Fairview"

 Charlottesville
 Robert Edward Lee (sculpture), Henry Shrady and Leo Lentelli, sculptors, 1924. There is no historical link between Lee and Charlottesville, and the City Council of Charlottesville voted in February, 2017, to remove it, and to rename Lee Park, Emancipation Park. This led to the white supremacist Unite the Right rally in August, 2017, in which there were three fatalities. A lawsuit, unresolved as of October, 2018, generated an injunction prohibiting the city from removing the statue or "adding context". The statues were then shrouded in black, but the shrouds were removed in 2018. In the City Council meeting of July, 2018, the name of the park was changed again, to Market Street Park.The statue was vandalized with red paint and the words "Native Land", during the night of July 7–8, 2017; this was "just hours ahead of a rally by the Loyal White Knights of the Ku Klux Klan in Justice Park." It was defaced again with the word "FREDOM" [sic]; the vandalism was discovered on February 19, 2019. In April, 2019, a circuit court judge ruled that the statues of Lee and Jackson "are war monuments that the city cannot remove without permission from the state." Whether the statute in question applies retroactively to monuments that antedate the law is an issue headed for the state Supreme Court.
 Thomas Jonathan ("Stonewall") Jackson (sculpture), by Charles Keck, erected in 1921. Originally the Charlottesville City Council had intended to leave it, but following the violence of the Unite the Right rally of August 10–11 (provoked by the decision to remove the Lee statue), the Council voted on September 5, 2017, to remove it, and the park it was located in was renamed Justice Park. A lawsuit blocked immediate removal or "adding context". The statue was also shrouded in black. Legal action forced the removal of the shroud in 2018. At the City Council meeting of July, 2018, the park name was changed a second time, to Court Square Park. As of October, 2018, the fate of the two statues is unresolved. In April, 2019, a circuit court judge ruled that the statues of Lee and Jackson "are war monuments that the city cannot remove without permission from the state." Whether the statute in question applies retroactively to monuments that antedate the law is an issue headed for the state Supreme Court.
University of Virginia Cemetery: Confederate monument (1893), by Caspar Buberl. Justin Greenlee draws a parallel between the erection of this monument, at whose dedication slavery was denied as a cause of the Civil War, and the adjacent cemetery for slaves, which was robbed of bodies for dissection in UVA's School of Medicine and Anatomy.
 Culpeper County: UDC monument (1929) commemorating Confederate victory in the Battle of Brandy Station
 Farmville: Virginia Defenders of State Sovereignty Confederate Soldier Monument (1900)
 Fairfax, Virginia: John Quincy Marr monument, dedicated to the first Confederate officer killed in the Civil War during the Battle of Fairfax Court House (June 1861) Erected 1904.
 Franklin: Confederate Monument (1911)
 Fredericksburg
 Confederate Monument (2009)
 "The Angel of Marye's Heights" Monument, statue of Sergeant Richard Rowland Kirkland giving water to fallen union soldier. (1965)
 The Heights at Smith Run (2014)
 Thomas R.R. Cobb Monument and Marker (1888)
 Glen Allen: J.E.B. Stuart Memorial (1888)
 Gloucester: Confederate Monument (1889)
 Goshen Pass: Maury Memorial, stone monument marker (1923)
 Hanover: Confederate Monument (1914)

 Hampton:
 Two monuments at Big Bethel Cemetery, within Langley Air Force Base:
Big Bethel UDC Monument (1905)
UDC Monument (1964), commemorating the 100th anniversary of the Battle of Big Bethel
 Hampton National Cemetery: Two small, granite blocks near the burial location of 272 Confederates are inscribed "To Our Confederate Dead"
 Harrisonburg, Virginia: "Talbot Boys" monument (1914) at the Cross Keys battlefield, moved there from Talbot County Courthouse, Maryland, in 2022.
 Hopewell: Confederate Memorial (1949)

 Lebanon: Confederate Monument (1914)
 Lexington
Francis H. Smith Confederate Monument (1931)
 Stonewall Jackson Monument and Arch
 Washington and Lee University
 Previously Washington University, was renamed weeks after Robert E. Lee died as the President of the university.
 A large Confederate battle flag and a number of related flags were removed from the Chapel in 2014.
 Inside Lee Chapel, in place of an altar, is a large marble statue of Lee, recumbent, wearing Confederate battle gear and resting on a camp bed. (Lee is buried with his family in a mausoleum beneath the chapel.)
 Robert E. Lee Residence.
 Grave of Traveller, Robert E. Lee's horse (1871). Apples are regularly placed on the grave by visitors.
 Virginia Military Institute
Francis H. Smith statue (1931). Smith served in the CSA for four years during his tenure at VMI.
Virginia Mourning Her Dead, a bronze statue by Moses Ezekiel, dedicated 1903, moved to current location 1912, "honors the ten cadets from the school who fought and died after being wounded on the battlefield near New Market on May 15, 1864.... A ceremony to commemorate the deaths is held every year at the monument on the anniversary of the battle."
 Stonewall Jackson Monument and Arch (1912): A bronze replica of a 1910 marble statue of Stonewall Jackson on display at the West Virginia State Capitol. First-year cadets exiting the barracks through the archway were in the past required to salute the statue.
 Luray:
 Confederate Monument (1898)
 Page County Confederate Monument (1918)
 Lynchburg:
 Confederate Statue opposite Courthouse.
 Fort Early and Jubal Early Monument (1919)
 Confederate Monument (1900)
 Mechanicsville: Wilcox's Alabama Brigade (1999)
 Mecklenburg County: Confederate statue in front of the Courthouse.
 Middletown: Monument (1919) to Stephen Dodson Ramseur at entrance to Belle Grove Plantation, where he died following the Battle of Belle Grove.

 Mount Jackson: "Our Soldiers Cemetery" statue (1903)
 New Kent: Confederate Monument (1934)
 New Market: This Rustic Pile Monument (1909)
 Newport News: Confederate Soldier Monument (1909)
 Nickelsville: Nickelsville Spartan Band Monument (2000)

 Orange County: Confederate monuments at Wilderness Battlefield include:
 Wilderness Battlefield Tablet (1927), UDC monument
 Colonel James D. Nance Tablet (1912), marks where Nance was killed
 Texas Brigade Shaft (1964), "'Who are you my boys?' Lee cried as he saw them gathering. 'Texas boys,' they yelled, their number multiplying each second."
 "Lee to the Rear!" Tablet (1903), "Lee to the Rear! Cried the Texans. May 6, 1864"
 Parksley: Confederate Monument (1899). Inscriptions read: "They died for the principles upon which all true republics are founded"; "They fought for conscience sake [ sic ] and died for right"; "At the call of patriotism and duty, they encountered the perils of the field and were faithful even unto death." The front of the monument gives this information: "Erected by Harmanson-West Camp Confederate Volunteers in memory of their dead comrades from Accomack and Northampton Counties." The monument was made by Gaddess Brothers of Baltimore of Barre granite, and is about 30 feet tall.

 Petersburg:
 Petersburg National Battlefield
 Hagood's Brigade, a monument in the Petersburg National Battlefield. Text on front: "Here a brigade composed of the 7th battalion, the 11th, 21st, 25th and 27th regiments South Carolina Volunteers, commanded by Brig. Gen. Johnson Hagood, charged Warren's Federal Army Corps, on the 21st day of August 1864, taking into the fight 740 men, retiring with 273. // No prouder fate than theirs who gave their lives to liberty." Text on rear: "Placed here by Wm. V. Izlar, a survivor of the charge, aided by other South Carolinians."
 Old Men and Boys Monument (1909), in Petersburg National Battlefield. Text: "This stone marks the spot where the old men and boys of Petersburg under Gen. R.E. Colston and Col. F.H. Archer 125 strong on June 9th, 1864 distinguished themselves in a fight with 1,300 Federal Cavalry under Gen. Kautz, gaining time for the defeat of the expedition. // Placed by the Petersburg Chapter U.D.C. May 1909"
 Mahone Monument, Battle of the Crater, Petersburg National Battlefield (1927), erected by the United Daughters of the Confederacy
 Monument where A. P. Hill was killed during the Third Battle of Petersburg
 Monument where John Pegram was killed during the Battle of Hatcher's Run
 Pulaski: In Memory of the Confederate Soldiers of Pulaski County, 1861–1865 Monument (1906)
 Reams: North Carolina Monument

 Richmond:
 A.P. Hill Monument, Caspar Buberl, (1892) Defaced with red paint the night of August 21–22, 2018.
 Confederate Soldiers and Sailors Monument, Libby Hill Park (1894). Defaced with graffiti in 2015.
 Hunter Holmes McGuire statue, on Capitol Square. McGuire was a Confederate veteran, Stonewall Jackson's personal physician, and an influential supporter of the "Lost Cause" view of the Confederacy and the Civil War.
 The Memorial Granite Pile, Confederate Section, Hollywood Cemetery
 Monument Avenue featured monuments of Confederate leaders. In 2017, city officials started to hold public meetings for community input on the future of the city's many Civil War monuments and statues. In February 2019, in the midst of controversy surrounding a blackface picture in new Virginia Governor Ralph Northam's medical school yearbook, former FBI Director and U.S. Deputy Attorney General James Comey published an op ed in the Washington Post, suggesting that Virginia should get rid of the Confederate statues in Richmond: "Expressing bipartisan horror at blackface photos is essential, but removing the statues would show all of America that Virginia really has changed." On June 4, 2020, Gov. Northam ordered the state-controlled Robert E. Lee monument removed from Monument Avenue. Further, in June 2020 Mayor Levar Stoney and all nine members of the Richmond City Council announced their support for the removal of the remaining four Confederate monuments from Monument Avenue, when the city gets the authority to do so under a new state law that takes effect July 1, 2020. 
 Robert E. Lee Monument (1890). This was the only monument on Monument Avenue on state rather than city property. In November 2017, Virginia governor Terry McAuliffe, in response to ongoing clashes at the monument, issued emergency regulations which make a permit necessary for any meeting with more than 10 people, and prohibiting firearms. On January 6, 2020, the monument of Lee was defaced with the words "This is racist" and Jackson's with the words "God is gay". The equestrian statue of Lee was finally removed on 8 September 2021 at the direction of the state government.
 Roanoke: In June 2020, the Roanoke City Council voted to start the legal process to remove the Robert E. Lee Memorial in Lee Plaza after the July 1, 2020 date when a new state law removes the prohibition against removing monuments to the Confederate States of America.
 Stephenson: Memorial to Lieutenant Colonel Richard Snowden Andrews and Men of 1st Maryland Battery, CSA (1920)
 Strasburg: Confederate Monument (1896), Strasburg Presbyterian Church Cemetery

 Suffolk: Confederate Monument (1889), Cedar Hill Cemetery
 Virginia Beach: Princess Anne County Confederate Heroes Monument (1905)

 Wilderness: Monument (1903) near where Stonewall Jackson's amputated arm was buried
 Williamsburg: Confederate Monument off Penniman Road named for  John B. Magruder
 Winchester: Stonewall Confederate Cemetery, now a section of Mount Hebron Cemetery. Plaque: "Stonewall  Cemetery / 3000 Confederate soldiers rest here. / Dedicated 1866."
Monument to the Unknown and Unrecorded Dead. Front: "Erected A.D. 1879, by the people of the South / To the 829 unknown Confederate Dead / who lie beneath this mound / in grateful remembrance of their Heroic Virtues / And that their example of unstinted devotion / to Duty and Country may never be forgotten." Left side: "Who they were, none know; / What they are, all know." Rear: "On fame’s eternal camping ground / Their silent tents are spread; / While glory guards with solemn round / This bivouac of the dead."
In honor of the women of Winchester, 1999
 Alabama memorial
 Arkansas monument, 2011
 Florida memorial
 Georgia memorial
 Louisiana memorial
 Mississippi plaque, 1998

Private monuments
 Blairs: A 51 by 31 feet Confederate flag, near U.S. 29, was according to its erectors the largest one in existence (as of 2017).
 Franklin County: Jubal A. Early House, the General's boyhood home. Owned by the Jubal A. Early Preservation Trust.

 Harrisonburg: Turner Ashby Monument (1898), located on Turner Ashby Lane. In 2019, the monument was vandalized "when someone threw eggs, raw meat, and other substances on it." In February, 2020, it was vandalized with red paint.
 Petersburg: The former Blandford Church was turned by the Ladies Memorial Association of Petersburg into a Confederate memorial, or as the city's Web site puts it, "a shrine to its 'Lost Cause.'"
 Templeton: Army of Northern Virginia Memorial Flag located off of I-95 and Highway 301 Is a large Confederate Battle Flag put up by the VA Flaggers accompanied by a Stars and Bars flag and a South Carolina State Flag also on the monument is a sign that says “CONFEDERATE STATES OF AMERICA. GENERAL WADE HAMPTON. Army of Northern Virginia. Memorial Flag.

Parks and sites

 Fort Monroe: Jefferson Davis Memorial Park (1956). Dedicated by UDC, the park commemorates the CSA president's two years of imprisonment in the fort.
 Fredericksburg: Lee Hill Community Center
 Roanoke: In June 2020, the Roanoke City Council voted to start the legal process to rename Lee Plaza after the July 1, 2020 date when a new state law removed the prohibition against removing monuments to the Confederate States of America. -now Freedom Plaza.

Roads

 Alexandria:
 Beauregard Street
 Bragg Street
 Braxton Place
 Breckinridge Place
 Chambliss Street
 Dearing Street
 Donelson Street
 Early Street
 Floyd Street
 French Street
 Frost Street
 Gordon Street
 Hardee Place
 Hume Avenue
 Imboden Street
 Iverson Street
 Jackson Place
 Janney's Lane
 Jordan Street
 Jubal Avenue
 Lee Street
 Longstreet Lane
 Maury Lane
 Pegram Street
 Quantrell Avenue
 Reynolds Street
 Rosser Street
 Van Dorn Street
 Wheeler Avenue
 Annandale:
 John Marr Drive
 Lanier Street
 Rebel Drive
 Blackstone: Jeb Stuart Road
 Bland: Jeb Stuart Street
 Boones Mill: Jubal Early Highway
 Bristow: Robert E. Lee Drive
 Centreville:
 Confederate Ridge Lane
 General Lee Drive
 Chantilly:
 Mosby Highway
 Old Lee Road
 Culpeper:
 General A.P. Hill
 General Jackson Avenue
 General Jeb Stuart Lane
 General Lee Avenue
 General Longstreet Avenue
 General Winder Road
 Damascus: Jeb Stuart Highway
 Fairfax:
 Confederate Lane
 Mosby Woods Drive
 Old Lee Highway
 Pickett Road
 Forest: Jubal Early Drive
 Foster: Robert E. Lee Drive
 Fredericksburg: Jubal Early Drive
 Hardy: Jubal Early Highway
 Hopewell: Robert E. Lee Drive
 Ivor: General Mahone Boulevard
 Lynchburg: Early Street
 Manassas:
 Beauregard Avenue
 Lee Avenue
 Martinsville:
 Jeb Stuart Road
 Jefferson Davis Drive
 Mechanicsville: Lee Davis Road
 Middleburg: John Mosby Highway
 Natural Bridge Station:
 Jeb Stuart Drive
 Robert E. Lee Drive
 New Market:
 Confederate Street
 Lee Street
 Stonewall Street
 Stuart Street
 Petersburg:
 Confederate Avenue
 Jubal Early Drive
 Powhatan: Robert E. Lee Road
 Purcellville: Jeb Stuart Road
 Rhoadesville: Jeb Stuart Drive
 Richmond:
 Confederate Avenue
 Monument Avenue
 Mosby Court
 Sandston:
 Carter Avenue
 Confederate Avenue
 Early Avenue
 Garland Avenue
 J.B. Finley Avenue
 Jackson Avenue
 Kemper Court
 Pickett Avenue
 Wilson Way
 Staunton:
 Beauregard Drive
 J.E.B. Stuart Drive
 Stonewall Jackson Boulevard
 Verona: Confederate Street
 Virginia Beach:
 General Beauregard Drive
 General Hill Drive
 General Jackson Drive
 General Lee Drive
 General Longstreet Drive
 Hood Drive
 Waynesboro:
 Davis Road
 Pickett Road
 Robert E. Lee Avenue
 Winchester: Jubal Early Drive
 Woodford:
 Jeff Davis Drive
 Stonewall Jackson Road
 Wirtz: Jubal Early Highway

Schools
 Bridgewater: Turner Ashby High School, named for CSA colonel Turner Ashby, the "Black Knight of the Confederacy".  The school's football team are the "Black Knights".
 Bristol:
 Stonewall Jackson Elementary School (1948)
 Washington-Lee Elementary School (1968)
 Fairfax:
 Lees Corner Elementary, named for Lee family (including Robert E. Lee) as owners of Sully Plantation (1986)
 Fredericksburg: Lee Hill Elementary School (1952)
 Henrico: Douglas S. Freeman High School. Its athletic teams are nicknamed the "Rebels." The school has retired its "Rebel man" mascot.
 Hurley: Hurley High School. Its athletic teams are nicknamed the "Rebels." Confederate iconography, including the Confederate Battle Flag, is prominent throughout the school.
 Lexington: Washington and Lee University. See above, under "Other public monuments".
 Mathews Lee-Jackson Elementary School
 Montross: Washington and Lee High School
 Spotsylvania Courthouse:
  'Lee's Headquarters' monument (1903)
 Ramseur's Brigade monument (2001)
 Springfield:
 Sangster Elementary named for a prominent slaveholding family loyal to the Confederacy
 Stuart: Stuart Elementary School (1938)

Former or removed monument and memorials 
For a list of removed or renamed memorials, see Removal of Confederate monuments and memorials#Virginia.

See also
 Virginia in the American Civil War
 List of Confederate monuments and memorials
 List of memorials and monuments at Arlington National Cemetery
 Removal of Confederate monuments and memorials#Virginia

Notes

References

Virginia
Virginia
Virginia in the American Civil War